Isthmus Peak is the unofficial name of a  summit in the Kenai Mountains on the Kenai Peninsula in Alaska, United States.  The prominent is  ranking it 76th on the list of prominent peaks in the United States.

See also

List of mountain peaks of Alaska
List of the most prominent summits of Alaska

References

External links

Mountains of Alaska